Lithops dorotheae is a species of Lithops found in South Africa. It was named after Dorothea Huyssteen, who discovered the plant in 1935. It grows on fine-grained sheared quartz and feldspar rock containing feldspathic quartzite.

References

dorotheae